Kelani Matapo (born 3 February 1983) is a former rugby union and netball player. She made her debut and only appearance for the Black Ferns on 29 November 2011 against England at Esher, England.

Prior to making the Black Ferns, Matapo represented the Cook Islands in netball at the 2010 Commonwealth Games.

Personal life 
Matapo was born and raised in Titikaveka in the Cook Islands. Her father was Cook Islands High Commissioner to New Zealand from 2011 to 2016.

References

External links 

 Black Ferns Profile

1983 births
Living people
New Zealand women's international rugby union players
New Zealand female rugby union players
Netball players at the 2010 Commonwealth Games